The Pervaya Liga was the second level of ice hockey in the Soviet Union, below the Soviet Championship League. The league was first contested during the 1947–48 season.

References

2